Cooper Grace Ward Lawyers is an Australian law firm with a commercial focus. The firm office is located in the Brisbane central business district, Queensland. The firm has around 220 team members including 22 partners.

History 

1980
On 22 December 1980 three young lawyers founded Cooper, Grace and Ward Solicitors. With specialisations in Property Law, Commercial Law and Litigation, Peter Cooper, David Grace and Chris Ward began the Brisbane-based practice. The firm was located in the (then) MLC building in the Brisbane CBD.

1981 - 1990
During the eighties, the firm saw steady growth.  This was occurring as Brisbane itself saw a large degree of change and growth.  The river city was re-inventing itself as World Expo 88 heralded a new era in the city and attitudes within and towards it. 
1990
In 1990, the firm moved to the top-tier riverside location, Central Plaza 2. At this time, Australia's economy hit hard times with the recession of the early 90s. Chris Ward remembers the time as "really tough" but admits it provided an opportunity for the firm to learn a lot of valuable lessons about our structure and direction as a business.

1991 - 1995
In 1993, Cooper Grace and Ward become affiliated, but not financially integrated, with the national Hunt & Hunt Legal Group.

1996 - 2000
In 1996, Hunt & Hunt Brisbane merged with another commercial firm, Thompson King Connolly. By the year 2000, Brisbane was fast growing as an alternative for business from Sydney and Melbourne as major international companies such as Virgin Australia, Boeing Australia, Mincom Limited and Billabong (clothing) set up their head offices in Queensland. The growth in Brisbane over these years as a thriving business district meant that Queensland rapidly became Australia's fastest growing economy.

2001 - 2006
The firm decided to move forward from March 2006 as an independent Queensland-based firm that serviced local, national and international clients, under the name of Cooper Grace Ward Lawyers.

2009–present
In October 2009, Cooper Grace Ward expanded into a five green-star designed building at 400 George Street, Brisbane. The move was driven by the need for more space to accommodate the continuing growth of the firm. Within three weeks of the relocation to 400 George Street, Cooper Grace Ward made an announcement of a substantial merger with Bain Gasteen Lawyers, effective from 1 December 2009. The merger took the firm's total numbers to 200+ people. The merged firm was initially known as Cooper Grace Ward (incorporating Bain Gasteen) and from February 2010 became Cooper Grace Ward.

Notable Achievements 

In 2014, Cooper Grace Ward acted for former Queensland Government minister Dr Bruce Flegg in his defamation suit against his former media adviser, Graeme Hallett. Justice Peter Lyons upheld the defamation claim and awarded Dr Flegg damages of $775,000. This award is believed to be the largest award for a defamation case in Queensland history.

Work Groups 
Cooper Grace Ward Lawyers advises in the following kinds of law:

Corporate Sustainability 
Cooper Grace Ward Lawyers has been recognised  for its commitment to Corporate Sustainability.  The following activities form part of their corporate sustainability commitment: 
 Participation in Club Red, the Australian Red Cross's blood donation program.
 Member of the Queensland Government's ecoBiz program.  
 Reduced energy consumption by 14% per team member during 2010. 
 In addition to the waste management services offered by the building, the firm uses bokashi compost bins in the café and catering kitchen to manage food scraps. 
 Revegetating a patch of vacant land along the Brisbane River at North Quay. 
 Cooper Grace Ward is a corporate supporter of CityCycle

References

External links 

Law firms of Australia